Roses is the sixth studio album by Irish alternative rock band The Cranberries, released in the Republic of Ireland on 22 February 2012 and globally on 27 February 2012 through Cooking Vinyl and Downtown Records. Produced by Stephen Street, it was the band's first studio release in ten years. Originally planned to be released in late 2003, the recordings for the follow-up to Wake Up and Smell the Coffee were scrapped after the band decided to go their separate ways. After a six-year hiatus, The Cranberries announced their intention to record a new album during their 2009–2010 reunion tour. The title Roses was announced on The Cranberries website, on 24 May 2011.

In 2012 it was awarded a gold certification from the Independent Music Companies Association which indicated sales of at least 75,000 copies throughout Europe.

Recording sessions
The Cranberries worked on 19 tracks for the Roses album in Toronto and London between April 2002 and June 2003 with producer Stephen Street, who previously collaborated with the band on Everybody Else Is Doing It, So Why Can't We?, No Need to Argue and Wake Up and Smell the Coffee. Seventeen tracks were finished for the album. According to producer Stephen Street, the recordings recapture "the delicate darker mood of [the earlier Cranberries albums]". The album included string arrangements.

First session (Metalworks Studios, Mississauga, Ontario)
The Cranberries recorded 18 tracks at the Metalworks Studios in Mississauga, Ontario (Canada) from 18 April 2002 to 29 June 2003. All album tracks, except "Tomorrow", were recorded during the first session. "Losing My Mind" was first titled "Eyelash".

Second session (Miloco Studios, London)
The band and producer Stephen Street went into the studio st the Miloco Studios in London and "Tomorrow", was recorded during April 2011, and the other tracks were completed during this recording session. "Stars" was replaced by the new track "Tomorrow".

Composition
Asked about "Tomorrow", O'Riordan told Billboard that "it's about the way we sometimes hyper over-escalate things in our minds, overthink about things...when sometimes spontaneity and just jumping in is better. Tomorrow you might not have that moment back again. So it's really about moving on and also about kind of looking at the younger generation and how they worry about all kinds of silly things. They don't think they're silly, but when you're older you know better." A one-minute preview of the song was released on 31 July 2011.

"Astral Projection" is described as "a dreamy rock song which could be catchy", while "In It Together" "is a very feel good song creating the same type of atmosphere as 'Stars' – colourful".

"Schizophrenic Playboy" is a rock song dealing about the risks of sexual encounters. Noel Hogan described the studio mix of the song as "very James Bond". A one-minute preview of the song was released on 31 August 2011.

"Fire and Soul" is a ballad with drum loops and light electronica elements. A one-minute preview of the song was released on 13 October 2011.

The songs vary in pace and mood, from the soft and summery "Fire and Soul" to the reggae-infused "Raining in My Heart" and the sweeping storm that rages within "Conduct."
The title track "Roses" is described as a "very sparse [...], but a very strong track". The music was written by guitarist Noel Hogan a few years before the band went back into recording sessions.

The songs were planned to be included on the cancelled 2003 album. The band first worked on those titles with producer Stephen Street during some recording sessions in 2003, before re-recording them for the Roses album in 2011.

Track listing

Charts
In France, the album debuted at number 5 on the French Albums Chart, selling 8,950 copies, in Canada, the album debuted at number 6 on the Canadian Albums Chart, selling 3,100 copies.

Weekly charts

Year-end charts

Release history
During an interview with Billboard magazine in October, lead vocalist Dolores O'Riordan revealed that the album would be released in February 2012.

On 21 July, guitarist Noel Hogan suggested the possibility of releasing an EP before the release of Roses.

Certifications

References

External links
 

2012 albums
The Cranberries albums
Cooking Vinyl albums
Downtown Records albums
Shock Records albums
Albums produced by Stephen Street
Albums recorded at Metalworks Studios